P. potens may refer to:
 Psalodon potens, an extinct mammal species
 Purranisaurus potens, an extinct Late Jurassic metriorhynchid crocodile species

See also
 Potens (disambiguation)